Akaash Vani is a 2013 Hindi romantic drama film directed by Luv Ranjan, and produced by Kumar Mangat Pathak and Abhishek Pathak under the banner of Wide Frame Pictures. This is the second collaboration between the producer and director who had created the 2011 film Pyaar Ka Punchnama, and stars two of its leads, Kartik Aaryan and Nushrat Bharucha, in the titular roles. The film was released worldwide on 25 January 2013.

Plot
Akaash Kapoor (Kartik Aaryan) is a bold and fun-loving young man, while Vani Mehra is a conservative but friendly girl. They are both accepted in the same college in Delhi, and after a series of adventures, they soon become friends, forming part of a group of four. Akaash and Vani eventually fall in love and embark on a four-year relationship, which is kept secret from Vani's traditional parents.

As their final year ends, Akaash decides to go to the UK for his further studies. Vani returns to her hometown Dehradun to attend her sister's wedding, after which she plans to study for an M.B.A. She tells her sister about her relationship with Akaash, but her sister reacts negatively, saying their parents would disapprove. The next day, amidst the wedding preparation, Vani finds out that her sister has eloped with another man, who she was in love with but was not accepted by her parents. Vani's parents are heartbroken and have to endure the shame of their neighbors and community. In fear of society's response, they decide to marry Vani to a son of an acquaintance. Pressured by her parents and feeling guilt over her sister's actions, Vani reluctantly agrees. She emotionally ends things with Akaash via a phone call and requests him not to try and meet her. Akaash is devastated but slowly becomes bitter and detached with time.

Vani's husband, Ravi Sinha (Sunny Singh), is a charming but controlling man who pressures Vani to have sex, despite her reluctance. Ravi is emotionally abusive and expects Vani to cater to his every need, but pretends to be a perfect husband in front of friends and family. He prevents her from going out, working, or furthering her studies and expects her to be a full-time housewife. After an argument, Vani returns home and reveals her unhappiness to her parents. However, they send her back to Ravi after he charms them and ask him to consider starting a family to occupy Vani's time. Time goes by and Vani slowly begins losing self-confidence and becomes resigned to her fate. One day, Vani's aunt and uncle unexpectedly come to visit her and suggest she go back with them for several days to Delhi to attend her college reunion. Ravi is unhappy but reluctantly agrees since he will also be away on a business trip.

At the college, Vani reunites with her friends, Shekhar and Sumbul, who find her reserved and depressed. She also comes across Akaash, who is still bitter and hurt about their break up. He angrily confronts her and she runs away, deciding to return home that night. Her friends meet her at the train station, and Akaash finally breaks down and cries, something he has not allowed himself to do previously. Vani decides to stay. The group spends the week together, during which time they have fun and re-live their college memories. Vani tells Akaash the truth about her marriage but says she cannot divorce Ravi because her parents won't handle it, especially after her sister eloped. Akaash tells his friend that he hopes to reunite with Vani and plans to fill her days with adventures and happiness. He hopes this will raise her spirits and give her the courage to leave Ravi. The group travel to Chandigarh where Akaash and Vani spend time alone together and rekindle their romance. The trip is cut short by a phone call from Vani's parents, requesting she visits them. Conflicted, Vani chooses to return home and emotionally leaves Shekhar, Sumbul, and Akaash behind.

Akaash decides he can't lose Vani again, and the group follows Vani to her home. They stay happily with Vani's parents until Ravi arrives there, too. Akaash observes how Vani assumes the role of a subservient wife and how her husband ill-treats her. That night, Vani finally realizes that she can no longer live with a man who cannot respect her. Right away, in front of her friends and Ravi, she reveals the truth to her parents about the rape and emotional abuse Ravi has inflicted on her and demands a divorce. They are stunned and try to reason with her, but she stands her ground. An argument breaks out, and she slaps Ravi, after which he moves to hit her, only to be stopped by Akaash. Ravi realizes that the two are in love and insults Vani's parents. Vani's parents are embarrassed, but she defiantly tells them that her happiness is more important than their shame and leaves the house.

Vani returns to Delhi with her friends, where she finally furthers her studies and gets her M.B.A. degree. She happily divorces Ravi and later marries Akaash.

Cast
 Kartik Aaryan as Akaash Kapoor, Vani's love interest
 Nushrat Bharucha as Vani Mehra, Akaash's love interest
 Kiran Kumar as Vani's father
 Sunny Singh as Ravi Sinha, Vani's abusive husband
 Prachi Shah as Sunanda Malhotra, Vani's aunt
 Fatima Sana Shaikh as Sumbul Yakub, Akaash and Vani's friend and classmate
 Gautam Mehra as Shekhar Roy, Akaash and Vani's friend and classmate
 Mahesh Thakur as Vishal Malhotra, Vani's uncle
 Subhangi Latkar as Vani's mother

Critical reception
Akaash Vani received overall positive reviews from critics. IANS of NDTV rated the film 4/5, praising the performances of its lead pair. Renuka Vyavahare of The Times of India gave the film three stars, calling it a "strong [...] and moving social drama". Noted critic Taran Adarsh of Bollywood Hungama awarded the film 3.5 stars, and praised the acting and characterisation, adding that "[t]he movie contains just the right blend of sparkle and spice and is definitely worthy of a watch." On the other hand, Rajeev Masand of CNN-IBN was more critical of the film, giving it 1.5/5, commenting that the film's script is "inconsistent"

Release
Aakaash Vani DVD was released on 1 March 2013. Aakash Vani's television premiere was on Zee TV.

Distribution rights
All of Aakash Vani's rights were sold to Zee Entertainment Enterprises.

Soundtrack
The music of the film is composed by Hitesh Sonik with lyrics penned by Luv Ranjan. Musicperk.com rated the album 7.5 out of 10, saying, "(This is) a decent album and shows that Hitesh is here to stay for a lengthy stint." The item song "Crazy Lover" became a hit when it was released. Vishal Dadlani and Sunidhi Chauhan sang the song

See also

 List of Bollywood films of 2013

References

External links 

 
 

2010s Hindi-language films
Films directed by Luv ranjan
2013 romantic drama films
2013 films
Indian romantic drama films
Hindi-language romance films